Same-sex marriage has been legal in Zacatecas since 30 December 2021. On 14 December 2021, the Congress of Zacatecas passed a same-sex marriage bill by 18 votes to 10. The legislation was published in the official state gazette on 29 December, and came into force the following day. Prior to statewide legalisation, five municipalities of Zacatecas issued marriage licenses to same-sex couples despite a state ban, comprising about a quarter of the state population. These five municipalities were Zacatecas City, Cuauhtémoc, Villanueva, Miguel Auza and Fresnillo.

Legal history

Civil unions
A civil union bill was first proposed in Zacatecas in June 2011. The measure, which would have provided same-sex couples with a subset of the rights and benefits offered to married opposite-sex couples, was submitted to the Congress of Zacatecas on 30 June, but stalled in committee. The main sponsor of the bill said in 2013 that it was not prioritized. It had gathered the support of one deputy from the Institutional Revolutionary Party (PRI), some independents and some deputies from the Party of the Democratic Revolution (PRD), but was opposed by the conservative National Action Party (PAN). It was again discussed in March 2014, but the majority did not approve the measure.

Same-sex marriage

Background

On 12 June 2015, the Mexican Supreme Court ruled that state bans on same-sex marriage are unconstitutional nationwide. The court's ruling is considered a "jurisprudential thesis" and did not invalidate state laws, meaning that same-sex couples denied the right to marry would still have to seek individual amparos. The ruling standardized the procedures for judges and courts throughout Mexico to approve all applications for same-sex marriages and made the approval mandatory. Reacting to the Supreme Court ruling, a PRD deputy announced on 18 June 2015 that she would submit a bill to reform the state's civil and family codes to give same-sex couples the same rights as married heterosexual couples. A spokeswoman for the National Action Party immediately announced the party's opposition and condemned the Supreme Court ruling. The PRD bill was still pending in Congress in November 2017.

The state's first  was approved in May 2016. The couple, Rodolfo Eduardo Flores Nava and Francisco Domínguez Galindo, married in Zacatecas City in July 2016, making them the first same-sex couple to marry in Zacatecas. On 3 April 2017, a lesbian couple from Fresnillo was granted the right to marry by a court. Another same-sex couple from the same city was given the right to marry a few months later. They married in October 2017 in a private ceremony alongside family and friends; they were the first same-sex couple to marry in Fresnillo. By January 2019, three same-sex couples had married in Zacatecas City.

Attempt at legalization in 2019 and municipalities issuing licenses
The July 2018 elections resulted in the National Regeneration Movement (MORENA), a party that supports same-sex marriage, winning a plurality of legislative seats in Zacatecas. In late February 2019, MORENA Deputy Mónica Borrego Estrada introduced a new same-sex marriage bill to Congress, which she was hopeful would be agreed on shortly. Borrego Estrada called the heterosexual definition of marriage "a violation of the constitutions of Mexico and Zacatecas". The National Council to Prevent Discrimination also called on the state to legalize same-sex marriage. On 14 August 2019, Congress rejected the bill to legalize same-sex marriage in a 11–13 vote with 2 abstentions.

On 14 February 2019, officials in Zacatecas City announced they would begin issuing marriage licenses to same-sex couples. Governor Alejandro Tello Cristerna argued that the marriages would be invalid and expressed his personal opposition to the recognition of same-sex marriage, saying that authorities have to be "careful dealing with the topic". Bishop Sigifredo Noriega, who headed the Roman Catholic Diocese of Zacatecas, also stated his opposition, but nevertheless considered it necessary to find an alternative measure protecting the legal rights of same-sex couples without the "destruction of marriage". The first couple married on 23 February, and by 27 February another couple had married and five further couples had submitted marriage applications. The municipality of Cuauhtémoc followed suit in legalizing same-sex marriage on 1 March, and Villanueva on 20 May 2019. By 5 July 2019, Miguel Auza had also announced its intention to issue marriage licenses to same-sex couples, and in July 2020 the city council of Fresnillo approved a motion to conduct same-sex marriages in the municipality.

Passage of legislation in 2021
In September 2021, Deputy Xerardo Ramírez Muñoz from the Labor Party introduced a bill to legalize same-sex marriage to the Congress of Zacatecas. The bill was passed by a Congress committee on 9 December, and a final vote was scheduled for Tuesday, 14 December 2021. The legislation was passed by Congress on 14 December by a vote of 18–10 with 1 abstention. The law was published on 29 December 2021, following Governor David Monreal Ávila's signature, and took effect the following day, on 30 December 2021. The law ensures that married same-sex couples enjoy the same rights, benefits and responsibilities as married opposite-sex couples, including tax benefits, immigration rights, property rights, inheritance, etc., but excluding adoption rights. 

Article 100 of the Family Code was amended to read as follows:
 in Spanish: 
 (Marriage is the legal union of two people who, by means of a community of life, and procuring respect, equality and mutual aid, constitute a family.)

Marriage statistics
The following table shows the number of same-sex marriages performed in Zacatecas since 2021 as reported by the National Institute of Statistics and Geography.

Public opinion
A 2017 opinion poll conducted by  found that 46% of Zacatecas residents supported same-sex marriage, while 49% were opposed.

According to a 2018 survey by the National Institute of Statistics and Geography, 37% of the Zacatecas public opposed same-sex marriage.

See also

 LGBT rights in Mexico
Same-sex marriage in Mexico

References

External links
 Text of the Zacatecas same-sex marriage law (in Spanish)

Zacatecas
Zacatecas
2021 in LGBT history